At the 2010 Winter Olympics held in Vancouver, British Columbia, Canada, the final results of the men's figure skating competition sparked what has been dubbed a quadruple jump controversy.

At the heart of it lies a quadruple jump done in combination with a triple toe loop, which Evgeni Plushenko of Russia landed in both his short and long programs. Evan Lysacek of the United States, however, did not include quads in either of his programs. Plushenko, who led Lysacek by half a point after the short figure skating program, was beaten out by the American in the final free skate despite performing a quadruple toe loop/triple toe loop. Lysacek's free skate was regarded as having lower difficulty but better quality than Plushenko's.

Many experts of the field have offered their opinions about the results, and many members of the general public have weighed in on the controversy through online message boards, forums and social networking sites.

Background

Though the argument over the quad has attracted attention mostly following the men's figure skating competition at the Vancouver Olympic Games of 2010, the controversy itself is rooted in the quad's history, and its role at major figure skating competitions, including the Winter Olympics. The jump had become so common in men's figure skating since Kurt Browning first landed it in 1988 that it came to be viewed as a deciding element in a winning program and the lack of it almost a handicap.

Since the 1994 Olympics in Lillehammer, Norway, where Alexei Urmanov won gold without one, the quad, if landed in a competition (absent major weaknesses), made a difference between the first and lower placements. In a Sports Illustrated article dated January 19, 1998, E.M. Swift wrote that "no Olympic gold medal will ever again be won by a man who doesn't try a four-revolution jump." Many, therefore, tried to make themselves competitive by including it in their skating arsenal. In the twelve years leading up to the 2010 Olympics, only two skaters won the World Figure Skating Championships without a quadruple jump. Both wins were under the new ISU judging system.

Jeffrey Buttle's win at the 2008 Worlds officially disproved the already long-standing notion that a quad was needed to win the big titles. His win is credited to have been the spark that ignited the quad controversy that came to a head at the Vancouver Olympic Games. Brian Joubert, the first European skater to land three quads in a program, expressed his strong disappointment over the results and stated that the value of the jump should be raised in the current scoring system. Evan Lysacek, like Joubert, commented that a quad was an essential part of men's skating. In 2009, Lysacek became the second consecutive figure skater to win the world championship without a quadruple jump.

With Evgeni Plushenko and Stéphane Lambiel entering the race for gold at the upcoming Olympics, the quad debate intensified. "They saw there was two times the world champion (won) without a quad. From Todd Eldredge ages there was nobody without the quad to win the world," said Czech skater Michal Březina. "I think they did it just because of this. They want to show, if you want to be world champion of the ages you really have to do the quad. I don't think there is any other reason." Plushenko thought it was an embarrassment and not in keeping with the established practice, that the last two world champions had won without even attempting a quadruple jump. He challenged his competition to try and win the gold in Vancouver without it. "Whoever skates clean with a quad will win it. I don't think many will" said Lysacek of the Olympics in January, 2010.

Shortly after, however, citing a problem with his left foot stemming from a stress fracture, Lysacek said that he would not attempt a quad. When asked if he thought it would cost him gold, he replied that the new judging system made a win possible without one: "This season has been very telling, so if you go back and look at how the international competitions have been scored, my strategy has just changed a little." "I don't think anyone is unbeatable right now, because of the way the sport is judged. Obviously there's a lot of room for error, but there's also a lot of room to gain extra points on what you are doing."

2010 Winter Olympics

Free Skate

Lysacek finished with a career-best 257.67, 1.31 points ahead of Plushenko, becoming the first man since 1994 to win the Olympic title without doing a quadruple jump.

Tied with Plushenko artistically (both scored 82.80 for program components), the win for Lysacek became possible due to higher marks he received on the execution of such technical elements as jumps, spins and footwork. Commenting on Lysacek receiving higher technical marks than Plushenko, Frank Carroll, Lysacek's coach, said: "Plushenko was brilliant in the jumping. He did some brilliant, very difficult things. But if you think of his skating, he was very brilliant, then down. And very brilliant, then down. It was going in waves. Evan just sort of stayed in a straight line and kept going at a certain level from the start to the finish." Lysacek agreed with Carroll's assessment as to why he was able to prevail over the three- time Olympic medalist, whose technical prowess had always been his trademark: "If it was a jumping competition, they'd give you 10 seconds to go do your best jump. But it's about 4 minutes and 40 seconds of skating and performing from start to finish. That was my challenge tonight, and I feel like I did quite well."

Others regarded Lysacek's free skate as a well-rounded routine performed with better quality than that of his rival. "Plushenko may have done the quad, but the overall quality of Lysacek's program was better" said Jacques Rogge, the president of the IOC.
Multiple Olympic pairs skating champion Irina Rodnina said of Plushenko's free skate: "Evgeni had one big advantage – the quadruple jump – but at the same time, in the performance of our champion, there were enough small errors that weren't noticeable to all. Lysacek, meanwhile, had a winning appearance, a balanced program, all elements carefully woven into his program, logically. And Evgeni, it was especially obvious in the second half, was skating from jump to jump."

The way the competitors' long programs were structured as well as the marks for spins and step sequences were also mentioned as factors that ultimately tipped the scales in Lysacek's favor. Under the new ISU judging system all jumping passes in the last half of the free skate are worth an extra 10% in base value. In contrast to Lysacek's five jumps, Plushenko placed only three out of his eight jumping passes in the second half of his program. The strategic placement of Lysacek's jumps erased Plushenko's quadruple toe loop/triple toe loop advantage. As a consequence, Plushenko outscored Lysacek in the jumps by only 0.3 points. In that Plushenko's lead from the short program was marginal – only 0.55 points – the scoring for the spins and step sequences was what sealed Lysacek's win. The spins ended up eating up Plushenko's 0.85 advantage, since all three of Lysacek's spin sequences were awarded the highest level of difficulty – level 4, and only two of Plushenko's were given that rating. This led to Lysacek outscoring Plushenko by 1.26 points in the spins. Additionally, Plushenko's step sequences were graded 0.9 points lower than Lysacek's, resulting in Lysacek's 1.31 overall margin of victory.

Lysacek's marginal victory in the free skate, however, unleashed a wave of criticism that a routine more difficult and Olympic in nature had lost out to the one seen as out of the eighties and "below the modern standards" of men's figure skating.

Short Program

Plushenko's short program drew much praise from the International press which hailed him as the "King" of figure skating who had returned.

It was the score for his short program that most Russian analysts say ultimately deprived him of the highest medal. Going into the free skate, less than a point separated Plushenko, Lysacek and Daisuke Takahashi of Japan. Plushenko was the only one of the three to land a quad in combination with a triple toe loop in the short program. "I did a great short program but didn't get the marks I deserved. When I asked why, they told me I was skating early and they had to retain top marks for the last group," said Plushenko. The scant difference in the scores, a virtual tie, was slammed in the Russian media as dubious judging. "They 'buried' Zhenya (diminutive for Evgeni) before anything could be done. He should have won the short program with a 4 to 5 point lead, in my opinion. A short program is a technical one. And a 4+3 combination changes everything here because it shows that you're capable of doing more than others," said famous Russian coach Tatiana Tarasova.

Plushenko thought bias was clearly demonstrated in the scoring and expressed dismay at the Russian sports officials: "After the short program, three judges placed me 21st and 22nd for skating skills. These people came to the conclusion that I cannot skate at all. Given the situation, it's hard for me to understand where were our judges and the administration of our Skating Federation? Why couldn't a protest be filed following the short program? This [kind of judging] should have been prevented at once, because I don't believe my skating is of such a low level....I should have had at least a 5 point lead over my competitors. In the end however, the gap amounted to a mere 0.55 to which our Federation did not react at all."

The Russian Olympic Committee refused to provide legal support to Plushenko, who was going to protest the results on his own, citing the new ISU rules as barring such actions.
"Under the new ISU rules a complaint may be lodged only if a calculation (mathematical) error occurs. If the judges err in interpreting an element or its level of difficulty, it is considered a "human error" which can not be challenged...No lawyer would take on representing Plushenko's interests as no provision for challenging the judging under these circumstances exists," a source from the ROC was quoted as saying.

Still, the head of Russia's Skating Federation, Valentin Piseev, came under heavy criticism at home for not standing up vigorously enough for Plushenko in the face of 'the judges' arbitrary scoring.' "Evgeni's silver medal is a colossal result. The result achieved by him, his coach, choreographer and his spouse. But if the Federation had stepped in, he would have taken home the gold," said Irina Rodnina.

Allegations of conspiracy

Joe Inman's email
In the days leading up to the Winter Olympics, a US skating judge, Joe Inman, had set off a controversy by sending an email to 60 judges and officials, in which he drew attention to Plushenko's words spoken at a news conference in Bratislava, Slovakia on January 27, 2010:

"If the judges want someone to place high, they can arrange it. Like in Tallinn, Brian Joubert got more points for his transitions than me, although we did exactly the same transitions on the ice. In fact, we don't have any transitions because we focus on our jumps. So there are lobbies in the new scoring system as well, and the judges can influence the result."

The email  encouraged marking presentation scores more accurately by stating: "It is telling that Mr. Plushenko acknowledges having no transitions in his routine. The judges seem to miss what he is saying. We as judges should think about what we saw before putting that mark down."

Despite Joe Inman insisting that the emails were sent in innocence and meant to be a simple exchange among friends and teaching tools for people who had attended his seminars, the incident had touched off a frenzy in Europe and was seen as evidence of North America lobbying judges against Evgeni Plushenko and Brian Joubert.

Joe Inman was not a judge at the Olympic Games in Vancouver.

Judging

"Let me say this very clearly: The IOC has discussed this with the International Skating Union, the judging has been absolutely impeccable, there is nothing to criticize the judges. They have applied the system that has been approved", Jacques Rogge said.

However, many disagreed, some vehemently, calling the judging process no less scandalous than the judging controversy of the 2002 Winter Olympics and cited the athletes' scores as proof, in and of itself, of it being poor and biased. Alexei Mishin, Plushenko's coach, was furious at the judges and called their marks "nonsense," "wrong" and "criminal." Elvis Stojko called the judges' scoring ridiculous.

Like Stojko, several believed that USA's Johnny Weir outskated Patrick Chan of Canada and should have been, if not on the podium, at least higher than sixth. Three-time Olympic medalist Artur Dmitriev thought the score for Lysacek seemed a bit too high, though not surprising, considering the same judges awarded  Chan a 160.30 despite his several errors and even a fall on one of his jumps. Not only the score was higher than Weir's but it was only by 5.21 points lower than Plushenko's 165.51. "The ultimate score that Patrick Chan got did not in any way reflect his level of skating [at the Olympics]. It says a lot – not only that the judges were biased. It also proves that the current judging system that replaced the old one to assure more objectivity does not work," noted Dmitriev.

Tatiana Tarasova, who helped to train Evan Lysacek in 2009, called the high evaluation of the components of his program in Vancouver "simply hooliganism," adding that Plushenko's gold medal "was taken away from him." "When a person performs a quadruple jump, which is contested by a triple, and (both contenders) gain the same points, it raises questions," said Plushenko about the judges' marks. Reinhard E. Ketterer, the head coach of the Berlin Figure Skating Association, said: "We too are in shock. As of today, Plushenko is, without a doubt, the best figure skater in the world and quite justifiably so. He has a lot more difficult technical elements in his arsenal than others. The main thing is that he performed a quadruple toe loop – and that's what is expected of a real champion. Figure skating is not a ballet but a sporting competition. It seems to me that the judges had already in advance given their preference to Lysacek. As a coach, I felt it right away."

Responding to opinions that a little strategizing, including a 4+3+2 combination, for example, or adding another jump to the program would have easily propelled him to victory, Plushenko said that nothing would have changed what had already been decided. "...All of it is pish posh. Well, judge for yourselves: for the quality of my skating, three judges placed me 21st and 22nd. Strangely, the computer did not drop any one of the three. But what it did instead was to drop those judges who awarded me first place. Under the current system, if this is the way judges' marks are awarded, you can win, and you can just as equally lose. Don't get me wrong. I don't want to criticize the new rules; they are not bad. But they do need further refinement."

Explaining the difference in the way Plushenko's program components were judged in the short program and the way they were judged in the free skate, Valentin Piseev commented: "After what happened in the short program, I immediately turned to Panov, the Russian member of the ISU, who in turn informed Cinquanta, the ISU's president. Cinquanta got in touch with the sports director, notified him of our Federation's statement and said that he himself would take the situation under his personal control. As a result, in Plushenko's free skate, his components were judged just as Lysacek's."

In scoring Plushenko's "transitions/linking footwork" component, the judges seem to have been influenced by the Joe Inman email. Elena Tchaikovskaia commented on what ultimately turned out to be one determining factor in the competition: "Everyone's talking about transitions, everyone's talking about step sequences but, honest to God, for the first time in my life I'm hearing that an Olympic champion is winning the Games because of transitions between the elements!" In the short program, the judges gave Plushenko 6.8 for transitions — an all-time career low and a point lower than the scores he received for the four other components. Ten skaters were given higher marks than Plushenko for transitions in the long program. At two international competitions held prior to the Vancouver Olympics, however, Plushenko earned transition scores in the 7-7.5 range for the same programs he skated at the Olympics. Plushenko won the 2006 Olympics with a 7.82 mark for transitions in the short program and a 7.75 in the free skate, which were the highest marks given for transitions in the men's competition. According to Alexei Mishin, the low transition scores in Vancouver were the result of "the information war" against Plushenko.

Monetary interests

Explaining how Plushenko's technically superior short program was judged nearly equal to Lysacek's, Russian newspaper Express reported: "Not long before the Olympics, the International Skating Union (ISU) held talks with the U.S. television network ABC regarding a long-term contract. From reliable sources we learned that a condition had been placed on the ISU: the contract would be signed only if the U.S. got a gold in figure skating. The first place for the US in pairs and women's skating competitions was out of the question so the focus was on ice dancing and men's skating. Since Canadian ice dancers Tessa Virtue and Scott Moir were considered the strongest ice dance team, the decision was ultimately made to 'pull' Evan Lysacek up as the champion. 'Plushenko had no chances from the outset,' said a man familiar in the judging circles. 'Everything had been decided in advance. He was mercilessly robbed in the short program, and in the free skate, the referees just dynamically finished the matter off.' " 

Russian sports analyst and commentator Elena Vaytsekhovskaya in her article entitled "The Curtain" wrote: "Shortly before the Games, a rumor was leaked out from the top circles of the ISU that the International Skating Union was going to sign their next contract with American Television. The ISU already had such a contract before. But it was rather minuscule; five times smaller than the one rumored. From the first rumor there at once arose a second: allegedly because of this contract looming on the horizon the ISU would be exerting every effort to make sure that American and Canadian figure skaters receive the top placements possible at the Games."

She continues: "Even before the Games came to a close it became known that Lysacek wouldn't be a participant at the Worlds in March. The American right away was furtively accused of simply being afraid; as though the risk of losing, which would tarnish the glimmer of the highest Olympic title, was too great. In reality, all was a bit different. After Evan became the world champion a year ago, he was immediately offered a contract with the top American show "Stars on Ice." He signed it...Lysacek as the top star had assumed additional duties of promoting the show in the USA."

Noting the connection between "Stars on Ice" and the Exhibition Gala, Vaytsekhovskaya says: "The order of performances at the Figure Skating Exhibition Gala had usually been simple: the first act is made up of the also-rans and the unfortunate – those who did not make it to the podium, the second one features medalists and champions. In Vancouver, the order seemed odd: the silver medalists of the Games, Mao Asada and Evgeni Plushenko were wrapping up the first act. Lunacy, isn't it? However, nothing in this order was coincidental. The second half of the Gala happened to include precisely all those who Stars on Ice has had their eyes on, or those who have already settled in there [the show]."

Russia's reaction

In Russia, Plushenko's loss to Lysacek was seen by the majority of sports experts, analysts, commentators and the public as due to the judges' collusion and corruption.

"If we pass it over in silence we will forever remain in the backyard. We need to put the question bluntly why there was such refereeing.... We need to get to the bottom of it," said Sergei Mironov, the chairman of the Russian parliament's upper house.

The image of Plushenko being a dull and inartistic one-trick pony was dismissed as shameless propaganda, inasmuch as prior to the 2010 Olympics he had received nothing but praise for his artistry. The image was believed to have been contrived in order to cast doubt on Plushenko's legendary status, thereby grooming the viewers to accept an unprecedented win by the American over the Russian known for his consistency to perform the toughest maneuver in figure skating. "When it comes to a quadruple jump- it is quite simple really. If no one except for the one Russian skater is able to perform it, you need to make believe that this jump does not exist at all."

TV commentators and experts saw Plushenko's "saving power" in managing to land a seemingly off-axis triple Axel as a testament to what real mastery is all about, as few would have been able to save it. "This is exactly what determines the great skill of a figure skater – the ability to save a jump when needed, even in the most difficult situation. At the Olympics, mistakes are practically always bound to happen, and the one who is able to correct them wins it."

A sharp contrast to the way Plushenko was judged at the 2006 Turin Olympics was also pointed out.

In Turin, he was regarded as a genius, who after Yagudin's exit had no equals left; in Vancouver, he was perceived as an unwelcome threat to be reduced to an average skater easily bested by any Tom, Dick and Harry.

After his retirement "men's figure skating was quietly deteriorating. If you can't fly – at least crawl prettily. Instead of the elements that a few rare individuals are able to conquer, the emphasis began to be placed on the better quality performance of what can be done by 500 men. A multitude of athletes, their coaches and sports officials had already made their plans for the upcoming Olympics. And then thunder struck – Plushenko has returned!"

"As soon as Plushenko announced his return, the ISU distributed an instruction video on the subject 'How Not to Skate!' And imagine, Plushenko starred in it!" said Alexei Mishin smiling..."I think the Americanadian camp whose representatives do not possess a quadruple jump didn't want Plushenko to become the Olympic champion and did all it could to prevent that."

Awarding silver to the strongest athlete who chose to skate a physically difficult program befitting an Olympic champion was seen by some as insulting. "The irony is that had Plushenko skated Lysacek's program he would have done it effortlessly and without breaking a sweat. Lysacek, on the other hand, wouldn't be able to handle Plushenko's program," said Dmitriev.

During the medal ceremony, Plushenko who felt that his free skate performance was strong enough for gold, stepped on the top level of the podium on his way to the runner-up level, considered by some to be unsportsmanlike. Plushenko's website afterwards proclaimed "Silver of Salt Lake", "Gold of Torino", and "Platinum of Vancouver", with the platinum medal claim being removed after ridicule by critics. Following the Olympic medal ceremony, Russian Prime Minister Vladimir Putin sent Plushenko a telegram, congratulating him on the wonderful Olympic performance and saying his silver was worth gold. On March 24, 2010 Siberian jewelers decided to award Plushenko a special medal weighing more than half a kilo of pure gold.

Views on the future of figure skating

The results of the men's figure skating competition have also revived the debate on figure skating's identity and the direction in which it is headed as a sport. It is perceived by many as the Athleticism vs Artistry debate and the two points argued are clearly demonstrated in the viewpoints of both medalists.

Plushenko's participation at the 2010 Olympics was not only to defend his 2006 Olympic title, but also to show that the sport needs the quadruple jump  if it wants to move with the times.

"Of course we need transitions and spins and steps, harder and harder. But I don't know, I was making triples in 1994. I know in speedskating they have timing [world records], it gets better. Biathlon, they have new timing. I think we stopped," said Plushenko.

Lysacek, on the other hand, is of the opinion that skaters don't have to include the big jump as "imaginative spins, creative footwork and solid landings on non-quad jumps are enough to rack up the points under the ISU scoring system."

"If it was a jumping competition, there'd be no music, they'd give you 10 seconds to do your best jump and that would be it. But it's about the performance, it's what makes us so unique and so emotional for an audience to watch. I don't know why some people are so hung up on one particular element. That's one step out of a four minute 40 second free skate. Each and every step we take from the starting pose to the ending pose is accumulating points," said Lysacek.

Lysacek's stance, however, is in sharp contrast to his own previously held view that the quad was important in winning and "reviving the flagging interest in U.S. figure skating."

"I think we lost our big brand with the 6.0 [scoring system]. That was what everyone knew, whether they had ever watched skating or not. It's tough to rope people in when you don't have a brand -- and I think the brand now is the quad. Even when people see me on the street, all they know is the quad. So I think it's important for us to represent that."

Both Plushenko's and Lysacek's current points of view have only fueled the non-ending argument whether figure skating, men's in particular, should be viewed as an artistic or athletic competition.

Some say that skating needs well-rounded competitors and the balance, i.e. the better combination of artistry and athleticism should determine the gold.

Others, however, believe that it is fundamentally unfair to compare a technically superior program to a less physically demanding one, in terms of artistry, and that the subjective artistic components should be scored relative to the degree of difficulty of elements. Awarding a less challenging technical program the gold in Vancouver, they assert, is a step backwards in time rather than forward, and is contrary to the spirit of the Olympic Games' history and its motto.

Elvis Stojko said Lysacek's long program was technically comparable to what Brian Boitano did in 1988 and that even junior skaters could skate the same program. The Olympics had always been viewed as the event where athletes came to push the boundaries of  their sport, take risks and set new records. Now, according to Stojko, "...You don't have to risk it. You can play it safe and win gold. In what other sports do you have to hold back in order to win?"

When asked why he had decided to include the quad in his short and long programs for the 2008 US Championships, Lysacek's own answer indicated that he was once in agreement with Stojko's reasoning:

"I think it's important. It's good for me to keep challenging myself. I can't hold back on anything, and taking chances is what sports are about."

Plushenko's program was more ambitious and risky with the quadruple toe/ triple toe loop, while Lysacek did not even attempt the quad as a single jump "at the biggest moment on skating's biggest stage."

Sports journalist Kevin Blackistone wrote: "What has unfolded at the Vancouver Winter Games in figure skating would be the equivalent of not crediting Shaun White for his double McTwist in the half pipe and rewarding less ambitious snowboarders for getting the basics perfect."

"If you look at the Olympic motto 'faster, higher, stronger', the quad represents exactly that,"
Alexei Mishin said. "Myopically focusing on transitional moves between jumps instead of on the difficulty and innovation of the jumps themselves is the equivalent of judging the 100-meter sprint on style instead of speed."
"Winning the Olympic gold medal without performing a quadruple jump is like going back to the dark ages of men's figure skating."

It has also been pointed out that it is the difficult technical elements – jumps – that have turned figure skating into a modern sport at the Olympics. In the early days of the Olympic Winter Games, skaters performed single jumps. By the middle of the 20th century, they had graduated to double jumps. By the 1980s, the triple Lutz was the benchmark for men. Throughout the '80s, it was the triple Axel, though attempts at a quad were already being made. Finally, a quadruple jump became an essential element in the programs of many men in the '90s and into the new millennium. The fact that fewer skaters than ever before attempt to land the toughest element in figure skating, opting to go for points instead, does not represent progress, critics claim.

Quad in the ISU Code of Points system

ISU scoring system before changes

The controversial final outcome of the men's skate at the Olympics intensified the debate over the value of the quadruple jump and the athleticism it embodies in the ISU scoring system. Since its adoption in 2004, the ISU judging system has placed a greater value on "spins, transitions and small steps" in order to balance athleticism with artistry and encourage all-around skating. Critics, however, say that the current system achieves this balance by discouraging skaters from attempting the toughest element and leads figure skating to stagnation. It does this, they claim, by not awarding enough points for the quadruple jump and penalizing skaters if it is not done successfully.

In 2008, the scoring system adopted a requirement that a failed quad receive a deduction of up to three points. This has led to some skaters feeling that attempting to do a quad is not worth the risk and reward, as much easier jumps present a better opportunity for athletes to collect the needed points. "I had one fall in my program on a triple Lutz. They considered it a double with a fall. I got 1.09 points. Then Nobunari Oda fell on a quad but they downgraded it to a triple toe because it was under-rotated and he got one point. I got more points for falling on a cheated triple Lutz than he got falling on a cheated quad," said Jeremy Abbott on his dislike of the rule with reference to the 2009 Four Continents Figure Skating Championships.

A triple Axel is worth 8.2 points as opposed to the quad's base value of 9.8. A skater can earn up to three bonus points if the triple Axel is well executed. Some figure skaters feel that instead of risking penalties for falling while attempting a quad, it is better to attempt a triple Axel, which is safer and more likely to be landed cleanly. Additionally, the difference in base value between a triple Axel and a triple Lutz is 2.2 points, whereas between a quadruple toe and a triple Axel it is only 1.6 points. The degree of difficulty, however, between a triple Axel and a quad is greater than the degree of difficulty between a triple Lutz and a triple Axel.

Implemented changes to the ISU scoring system

Following the figure skating competition in Vancouver, the ISU was urged to reexamine the scoring system at its general assembly scheduled for June, 2010, and adopt changes in order to reward skaters who do technically difficult jumps.

The value of the quad was raised to over ten points – 10.3 – at the ISU conference. The values of some triple jumps were reduced and a step sequence was removed from the short program; and the second step sequence in the men's free skate would not be given a level but would have a base value of two and be judged on Grade of Execution. The GoE for triple jumps was reduced in value while the GoE for the quad remained the same.

See also
2002 Olympic Winter Games figure skating scandal
Sochi Ladies' singles judging controversy

References

External links
Official Vancouver Site

2010 in figure skating
Figure skating at the 2010 Winter Olympics
Controversies in Canada